Naqib ol Mamalek (نقیب‌ الممالک) was the title of the Chief-Persian storyteller in Qajar Iran. During the reign of Naser al-Din Shah Qajar, the popular Persian epics of Amir Arsalan, Malak Jamshid and other colloquial Iranian stories were told to the Shah by the Naqib ol Mamalek.

Malak Jamshid is clearly attributed to Mirza Mohammad Ali Naqib ol-Mamalek (Persian: میرزا محمد علی نقیب‌ الممالک). The Author of Amir Arsalan is disputed: While the Persian scholar Dr. Mohammad Jafar Mahjoub contributed this story also to Mohammad Ali Naqib ol-Mamalek, a second possible author Mirza Ahmad Naqib ol Mamalek is named by other sources. Most scholars hold Mohammad Ali for the more plausible author, although both are attested as Naqals (storytellers) of the Qajar period.

References

Qajar courtiers
19th-century Iranian writers